Development Team DSM is a German UCI Continental team founded in 2017.

Team roster

Major wins
2017
Paris–Roubaix Espoirs, Nils Eekhoff
 National U23 Road Race Championships, Max Kanter
Stage 6 Olympia's Tour, Jarno Mobach
2018
Prologue Istrian Spring Trophy, Nils Eekhoff
Stage 2 Istrian Spring Trophy, Marc Hirschi
 National U23 Road Race Championships, Max Kanter
Stage 2 Grand Prix Priessnitz spa, Marc Hirschi
Stage 3 Tour Alsace, Marc Hirschi 
Stages 2 & 4 Olympia's Tour, Max Kanter
2019
 Overall Istrian Spring Trophy, Felix Gall
Prologue, Niklas Markl 
Stage 2, Felix Gall
Youngster Coast Challenge, Niklas Markl
Stage 7 Tour de Bretagne, Nils Eekhoff
Ronde van Overijssel, Nils Eekhoff
 National U23 Road Race Championships, Leon Heinschke
2020
Stage 2b (TTT) Ronde de l'Isard
2021
Stages 3 & 5 Course Cycliste de Solidarnosc et des Champions Olympiques, Casper van Uden
Stage 2 Giro della Valle d'Aosta, Gianmarco Garofoli
Ronde van de Achterhoek, Casper van Uden
Liège–Bastogne–Liège Espoirs, Leo Hayter
Stage 2 Tour de Bretagne, Leo Hayter
Stage 7 Tour de Bretagne, Tobias Andresen
 National U23 Time Trial Championships, Leo Hayter
2022
Stages 2 & 4 Tour de Normandie, Casper van Uden
Stages 1 & 3a (ITT) Le Triptyque des Monts et Châteaux, Lorenzo Milesi
Stage 4 Tour de Bretagne, Casper van Uden
Stage 5 Giro della Valle d'Aosta, Oscar Onley

National champions
2017
 German U23 Road Race, Max Kanter
2018
 German U23 Road Race, Max Kanter
2019
 German U23 Road Race, Leon Heinschke
2021
 British U23 Time Trial, Leo Hayter

See also
Team DSM (men's team)
Team DSM (women's team)

References

External links

UCI Continental Teams (Europe)
Cycling teams based in Germany
Cycling teams established in 2017
2017 establishments in Germany